The City Center Towers Complex is located in Fort Worth, Texas that comprises two towers. It was designed by noted architect Paul Rudolph.

Bank of America Tower

At , Bank of America Tower (until 2017: D.R. Horton Tower) is the second tallest building in Fort Worth. It has 38 floors. It was completed in 1984. Its address is 301 Commerce Street. It is the taller of the two towers in the City Center Towers Complex. The two buildings resemble pinwheels but are not true twins.

Wells Fargo Tower, Fort Worth

Wells Fargo Tower, Fort Worth is a building located in Fort Worth, Texas. At , it is Fort Worth's fifth tallest building. It has 33 floors. Its addresses are Commerce Street, East 1st street, East 2nd Street, and Main Street. It was completed in 1982. It was the tallest building in Fort Worth from 1982 until 1983 when the Burnett Plaza was completed. It is the shorter of the two towers in the City Center Towers Complex. The buildings resemble pinwheels but are not true twins.

See also
 List of tallest buildings in Fort Worth

References
 
 

Skyscrapers in Fort Worth, Texas
Postmodern architecture in Texas
Twin towers
Paul Rudolph buildings